Hendrick Hudson School District is located in Westchester County, New York and is made up of five schools: three elementary schools, named Buchanan Verplanck, Furnace Woods, and Frank G. Lindsay and one middle school, named Blue Mountain Middle School and one high school, named Hendrick Hudson High School.

Elementary schools
The Buchanan-Verplanck school is located in the village of Buchanan.
The Frank G. Lindsey school is located in the hamlet of Montrose.
The Furnace Woods school is located in Cortlandt Manor.

Blue Mountain Middle School
Blue Mountain Middle School is located in Cortlandt Manor.

Hendrick Hudson High School
Hendrick Hudson High School is located in Montrose, New York 10548

References

External links

Buchanan-Verplanck Elementary School
Frank G. Lindsey Elementary School
Furnace Woods Elementary School
Blue Mountain Middle School
Hendrick Hudson High School

School districts in New York (state)
Education in Westchester County, New York